Champagnat is a commune in the Creuse department in the Nouvelle-Aquitaine region in central France.

Geography

The river Tardes flows northward through the eastern part of the commune.

The Voueize forms part of the commune's western border.

Population

Sights
 A menhir.
 The church of St. Martial, dating from the thirteenth century.
 The medieval castle of Champagnat.
 The fourteenth-century castle de Peyrudette.
 The château de Fournoux.
 A fifteenth-century chapel at Peyrudette.

Personalities
 François Denhaut (1877–1952), an early French aviator & engineer, was born here.

See also
Communes of the Creuse department

References

Communes of Creuse